Joseph Vilas (March 31, 1832 – January 7, 1905) was an American businessman and politician. He was the 10th Mayor of Manitowoc, Wisconsin.

Biography
Born in Ogdensburg, New York, Vilas went to Union College in Schenectady, New York. In 1852, he moved to Manitowoc, Wisconsin. He was involved with the mercantile, railroad, and paper manufacturing businesses. During the American Civil War, Vilas served as a draft commissioner. He served in the Wisconsin State Senate in 1863 and 1864 and was a Democrat. He also served as president of the village of Manitowoc. In 1893, he was elected mayor of Manitowoc. Vilas was president of the Board of Harbor Commissioners.  In 1868, he ran for election to the United States House of Representatives and lost the election to Philetus Sawyer. Vilas died by suicide with a firearm in his home in Manitowoc. He had been in ill health for several years. He was a cousin of William Freeman Vilas.

Notes

External links

1832 births
1905 suicides
People from Ogdensburg, New York
People from Manitowoc, Wisconsin
People of Wisconsin in the American Civil War
Union College (New York) alumni
Businesspeople from Wisconsin
Mayors of places in Wisconsin
Democratic Party Wisconsin state senators
Suicides by firearm in Wisconsin
American politicians who committed suicide
19th-century American politicians
19th-century American businesspeople